"Down With This" is the title of a top-five dance single by Charisse Arrington. It was the first single released from her debut album The House That I Built.

Chart positions

Track listings

US promo single

References

1996 singles
1996 songs
MCA Records singles